A Dangerous Game is a 1924 German silent adventure film directed by Harry Piel and starring Piel, Hermann Leffler and Claire Rommer. It is the sequel to The Fake Emir.

The film's sets were designed by the art director Kurt Richter.

Cast
In alphabetical order
 Friedrich Berger
 Ruth Beyer
 Maria Forescu
 Fred Immler
 Hermann Leffler
 Paul Meffert
 Harry Piel
 Claire Rommer
 Ruth Weyher

References

Bibliography
 Grange, William. Cultural Chronicle of the Weimar Republic. Scarecrow Press, 2008.

External links

1924 films
Films of the Weimar Republic
Films directed by Harry Piel
German silent feature films
German black-and-white films
German sequel films
German adventure films
1924 adventure films
Silent adventure films
1920s German films